Richard Clarke Steere (5 March 1909 – 17 March 2001) was an American Olympic fencer. He won a bronze medal in the team foil event at the 1932 Summer Olympics.

Steere was born in Kansas City, Missouri, and raised in Chicago. Steere studied at the United States Naval Academy, where he was on the medalist foil team. He served in the United States Navy and worked as a meteorologist under George S. Patton.

References

1909 births
2001 deaths
Sportspeople from Kansas City, Missouri
American male foil fencers
Fencers at the 1932 Summer Olympics
Olympic bronze medalists for the United States in fencing
Medalists at the 1932 Summer Olympics